Hatepinks is a French punk rock band originating from Marseille, formed in 2004. Their lyrics are based on a literal translation from French to English (or other languages) and their songs are very short, lasting between a few tens of seconds and two minutes.

French punk rock groups
Organizations based in Marseille